Doug Coleman is an American politician from Apache Junction, Arizona, who served as a member of the Arizona House of Representatives from January 2013 to January 2019. He also served as mayor of Apache Junction from 1995 to 2007 and was the first mayor of the city to be re-elected by the people.

Early life
Coleman grew up in Mesa, Arizona and graduated from Westwood High School. He earned a Bachelor's degree in Business, Office, and Distributive Education from Arizona State University in 1981 and a Master's degree in Vocational Education from Northern Arizona University in 1989.

Political career
Coleman began his political career in 1991 by serving on the Apache Junction City Council and after serving 4 years on City Council he was elected Mayor of Apache Junction in 1995. He was the first Mayor of Apache Junction to be re-elected by the voters and was re-elected 6 times. On January 31, 2012 Coleman resigned from City Council to run for the Arizona House of Representatives. Coleman served with Kelly Townsend as Arizona House of Representatives members from District 16 from 2013 to 2019.

Political Positions

Doug Coleman is a moderate Republican. The American Conservative Union gives him a lifetime 76% score and the Arizona chapter of the fiscally conservative Americans for Prosperity gave him a 52% rating. Coleman voted in favor of the state's Medicaid expansion. On social issues, he has mixed positions and ratings. Planned Parenthood, which is pro-choice on the issue of abortion, has given him a rating of 20% while the socially conservative Center for Arizona Policy gave him an 80% rating; NARAL Pro-Choice America gave him a 0% rating. On immigration, he voted against requiring stricter sentencing requirements for undocumented immigrants, but he did vote to establish a virtual border. He supports gun ownership rights and has voted to loosen gun restrictions. He had a 7% from the National Rifle Association in 2012, but then received a 93% rating from the NRA.

Personal life
Coleman and his wife Roxanne have been married for 42 years. They have 6 daughters, 3 sons-in-law, and 19 grandchildren. He has also served in multiple volunteer positions for a local council of the Boy Scouts of America. Coleman is a member of the Church of Jesus Christ of Latter-day Saints.

References

External links
 
 

Living people
Year of birth missing (living people)
Republican Party members of the Arizona House of Representatives
Mayors of places in Arizona
People from Apache Junction, Arizona
Politicians from Mesa, Arizona
21st-century American politicians